The 1973–74 Allsvenskan was the 40th season of the top division of Swedish handball. 10 teams competed in the league. IFK Malmö won the regular season, but IF Saab won the playoffs and claimed their third Swedish title. Redbergslids IK and HP Warta were relegated. IFK Malmö's regular season average attendance has been estimated between 3300 and 4000, the highest ever in Swedish handball until IFK Kristianstad in the 2010s.

League table

Playoffs

Semifinaler
 IF Saab–Västra Frölunda IF 13–11, 15–17, 24–21 (Saab advance to the finals)
 SoIK Hellas–IFK Malmö 15–17, 14–11, 17–16 (SoIK Hellas advance to the finals)

Finaler
 IF Saab–SoIK Hellas 21–15, 14–17, 20–17 (IF Saab champions)

References 

Swedish handball competitions